Guy Rowland (born 1964) is a male retired cyclist who competed for England.

Cycling career
He represented England and won a bronze medal in the 4,000 metres team pursuit event, with Chris Boardman, Rob Muzio, Gary Coltman and Jon Walshaw, at the 1986 Commonwealth Games in Edinburgh, Scotland.

He won two National Championships.

References

English male cyclists
1964 births
Commonwealth Games medallists in cycling
Commonwealth Games bronze medallists for England
Cyclists at the 1986 Commonwealth Games
Living people
Medallists at the 1986 Commonwealth Games